George Louis Veneroso (February 27, 1909 – September 25, 1996) was an American football right tackle and coach who played for the Wilmington Clippers and Baltimore Blue Birds and later served as Clippers head coach. He was a player from 1937 to 1940 and a coach from 1941 to 1942, and again from 1947 to 1948. Veneroso was the coach of the Clippers when the won the American Association championship in 1941. He died on September 25, 1996 at the age of 87.

References

Players of American football from Pennsylvania
American football tackles
1909 births
1996 deaths
Wilmington Clippers coaches
People from Hazleton, Pennsylvania
George Washington Colonials football players
Temple Owls football players
Wilmington Clippers players